is a former Japanese football player.

Playing career
Tamura was born in Tokushima on July 3, 1978. In July 2000, when he was a Momoyama Gakuin University student, he joined J1 League club Gamba Osaka. However he could not play at all in the match until 2002. In July 2002, he moved to J2 League club Sagan Tosu. He played many matches as midfielder in 2002. However he could not play many matches in 2003. In 2004, he moved to Japan Football League club Ehime FC. However he could not play many matches and retired end of 2006 season.

Club statistics

References

External links

1978 births
Living people
Momoyama Gakuin University alumni
Association football people from Tokushima Prefecture
People from Tokushima (city)
Japanese footballers
J1 League players
J2 League players
Japan Football League players
Gamba Osaka players
Sagan Tosu players
Ehime FC players
Association football midfielders